Andreja Klepač and María José Martínez Sánchez were the defending champions, but Klepač chose not to participate this year. 

Kirsten Flipkens and Johanna Larsson won the title, defeating Martínez Sánchez and Sara Sorribes Tormo in the final, 6–2, 6–4.

Seeds

Draw

Draw

References

External links
 Main draw

Mallorca Openandnbsp;- Doubles
Doubles